The La Macarena Fault is a thrust fault in the department of Meta in Colombia.

Etymology 
The fault is named after the Serranía de la Macarena.

Description 
The Macarena Fault extends along the eastern border of the Serranía de la Macarena, which is an isolated tectonic block to the east of the Eastern Ranges of the Colombian Andes. The fault thrusts Precambrian crystalline rocks and Tertiary oceanic rocks on the west over Tertiary and Pleistocene continental rocks on the east. The course of the Guayabero River is controlled by the fault, showing strong lineations. Pleistocene sediments and alluvial terraces are apparently offset. There is a prominent fault scarp on the west side of the river.

See also 

 List of earthquakes in Colombia
 Bucaramanga-Santa Marta Fault
 Eastern Frontal Fault System

References

Bibliography

Maps

Further reading 
 

Seismic faults of Colombia
Thrust faults
Inactive faults
Faults